3250 or variation, may refer to:

In general
 A.D. 3250, a year in the 4th millennium CE
 3250 BC, a year in the 4th millennium BCE
 3250, a number in the 3000 (number) range

Other uses
 3250 Martebo, an asteroid in the Asteroid Belt, the 3250th asteroid registered
 Nokia 3250, a cellphone
 Texas Farm to Market Road 3250, a state highway

See also

 , a WWI U.S. Navy patrol vessel